The Pac-12 Conference Women's Basketball Player of the Year is a basketball award given to the Pac-12 Conference's most outstanding player. The award was first given following the 1986–87 season, the first year in which the league then known as the Pacific-10 Conference (Pac-10) officially sponsored women's sports.

Currently, two bodies vote for players of the year. The league's head coaches have selected a winner since the award's inception, and media members who cover Pac-12 women's basketball began presenting their own version of the award in the 2009–10 season. As is the case with the corresponding men's award, coaches are not allowed to vote for their own players.

Nine players have won the award more than once, but only two, Candice Wiggins of Stanford and Sabrina Ionescu of Oregon, have won three times, and only Ionescu has won all three awards consecutively. Six players have won a major end-of-season national award in the year that they won the conference award. Four of them are from Stanford: Jennifer Azzi claimed the Naismith Award and Wade Trophy in 1990; Kate Starbird won the Naismith Award in 1997; Wiggins received the Wade Trophy in 2008; and Chiney Ogwumike won the Wooden Award in 2014. The others are Kelsey Plum of Washington, who won all three major awards in 2017, and Ionescu, who received the Wade Trophy and Wooden Award in 2019 and all three major awards in 2020.

There have been four shared awards. Starbird and Tanja Kostić of Oregon State tied for the coaches' award in 1996. In 2015, Reshanda Gray of California won the coaches' award and Ruth Hamblin of Oregon State won the media award. The following year, Jamie Weisner of Oregon State won the coaches' award outright and shared the media award with Jillian Alleyne of Oregon. Most recently, Stanford teammates Cameron Brink and Haley Jones shared honors in 2022, with Brink receiving the media award and Jones the coaches' award.

For most of the award's history, the list of honorees has been dominated by Stanford, which has had 12 players earn a total of 20 awards. The rest of the conference has had 17 players earn a total of 19 awards. However, Stanford's 2022 awards were the Cardinal's first since the 2013–14 season. Three current Pac-12 members have yet to have a winner: established members Arizona State and Washington State, plus 2011 arrival Colorado.

Key

Winners

Winners by school

Footnotes

References

General 
 List of winners through 2014–15: 
 Classes of winners: All award winners but four—Landerholm (1987), Nelson (1988), Ragland (2001), and Pohlen (2011)—were on the conference's All-Freshman Team. Extrapolating from the conference's list of All-Freshman Team members allows a Player of the Year's class to be determined.

Specific 

Awards established in 1987
Player
NCAA Division I women's basketball conference players of the year